Chevrotains, or mouse-deer, are diminutive, even-toed ungulates that make up the family Tragulidae, and are the only living members of the infraorder Tragulina. The 10 extant species are placed in three genera, but several species also are known only from fossils. The extant species are found in forests in South and Southeast Asia; a single species, the water chevrotain, is found in the rainforests of Central and West Africa. They are solitary, or live in loose groupings or pairs, and feed almost exclusively on plant material. Chevrotains are the smallest hoofed mammals in the world. Despite their common name of "mouse deer", they are actually not true deer at all (Cervidae), but form a unique family of bovids closer in lineage to cattle or antelope.

In November 2019, conservation scientists announced that they had photographed silver-backed chevrotains (Tragulus versicolor) in a Vietnamese forest for the first time since the last confirmed sightings in 1990.

Etymology

The word "chevrotain" comes from the Middle French word chevrot (kid or fawn), derived from chèvre (goat).

The single African species is consistently known as "chevrotain". The names "chevrotain" and "mouse-deer" have been used interchangeably among the Asian species, though recent authorities typically have preferred chevrotain for the species in the genus Moschiola and mouse-deer for the species in the genus Tragulus. Consequently, all species with pale-spotted or -striped upper parts are known as "chevrotain" and without are known as "mouse-deer".

The Telugu name for the Indian spotted chevrotain is jarini pandi, which literally means "a deer and a pig". In Kannada, it is called barka (ಬರ್ಕ), in Malayalam, it is called  kūramān, and the Konkani name for it is barinka. The Tamil term is  sarukumāṉ "leaf-pile deer". The Sinhala name  roughly translates to "mouse-like deer". This was used in the scientific name of the Sri Lankan spotted chevrotain, M. meminna.

Biology
The family was widespread and successful from the Oligocene (34 million years ago) through the Miocene (about 5 million years ago), but has remained almost unchanged over that time and remains as an example of primitive ruminant form. They have four-chambered stomachs to ferment tough plant foods, but the third chamber is poorly developed. Though most species feed exclusively on plant material, the water chevrotain occasionally takes insects and crabs or scavenges meat and fish. Like other ruminants, they lack upper incisors. They give birth to only a single young.

In other respects, however, they have primitive features, closer to nonruminants such as pigs. All species in the family lack antlers and horns, but both sexes have elongated canine teeth. These are especially prominent in males, where they project out on either side of the lower jaw, and are used in fights. Their legs are short and thin, which leave them lacking in agility, but also helps to maintain a smaller profile to aid in running through the dense foliage of their environments. Other pig-like features include the presence of four toes on each foot, the absence of facial scent glands, premolars with sharp crowns, and the form of their sexual behaviour and copulation.

They are solitary or live in pairs. The young are weaned at three months of age, and reach sexual maturity between 5 and 10 months, depending on species. Parental care is relatively limited. Although they lack the types of scent glands found in most other ruminants, they do possess a chin gland for marking each other as mates or antagonists, and, in the case of the water chevrotain, anal and preputial glands for marking territory.

Some of the species show a remarkable affinity with water, often remaining submerged for prolonged periods to evade predators or other unwelcome intrusions. This has also lent support to the idea that whales evolved from water-loving creatures that looked like small deer.

Taxonomy
Tragulidae's placement within Artiodactyla can be represented in the following cladogram:

Traditionally, only four extant species were recognized in the family Tragulidae. In 2004, T. nigricans and T. versicolor were split from T. napu, and T. kanchil and T. williamsoni were split from T. javanicus. In 2005, M. indica and M. kathygre were split from M. meminna. With these changes, the 10 extant species are:

 Family Tragulidae
 Genus Hyemoschus
 Water chevrotain, Hyemoschus aquaticus
 Genus Moschiola
 Indian spotted chevrotain, Moschiola indica
 Sri Lankan spotted chevrotain, Moschiola meminna
 Yellow-striped chevrotain, Moschiola kathygre
 Genus Tragulus
 Java mouse-deer, Tragulus javanicus
 Lesser mouse-deer or kanchil, Tragulus kanchil
 Greater mouse-deer, Tragulus napu
 Philippine mouse-deer, Tragulus nigricans
 Vietnam mouse-deer, Tragulus versicolor
 Williamson's mouse-deer, Tragulus williamsoni

Ancient chevrotains

The Hypertragulidae were closely related to the Tragulidae.

The six extinct chevrotain genera include:

Genus Dorcatherium
Dorcatherium minus from Pakistan
Dorcatherium majus from Pakistan
Dorcatherium naui, from Central Europe
Genus Dorcabune
Dorcabune anthracotherioides from Pakistan
Dorcabune nagrii from Pakistan
Genus Afrotragulus Sánchez, Quiralte, Morales and Pickford, 2010 
 Afrotragulus moruorotensis (previously "Dorcatherium" moruorotensis Pickford, 2001) (early Miocene) from Moruorot, Kenya
 Afrotragulus parvus (previously "D." parvus Withworth 1958) (early Miocene) from Rusinga Island, Kenya
Genus Siamotragulus
Siamotragulus sanyathanai Thomas, Ginsburg, Hintong and Suteethorn, 1990 (middle Miocene) from Lampang, Thailand
Siamotragulus haripounchai Mein and Ginsburg, 1997 (Miocene) from Lamphun, Thailand
Genus Yunnanotherium
Genus Archaeotragulus
Archaeotragulus krabiensis Metais, Chaimanee, Jaeger and Ducrocq, 2001 (late Eocene) from Krabi, Thailand

The extinct chevrotains might also include
Genus Krabitherium
Krabitherium waileki Metais, Chaimanee, Jaeger and Ducrocq, 2007 (late Eocene) from Krabi, Thailand
Genus Nalameryx
Nalameryx savagei
Nalameryx sulaimani

See also

Footnotes

References

External links

 
Extant Miocene first appearances
Mammal families
Mammals of Southeast Asia
Chevrotain